Rolf Julin (14 April 1918 – 26 July 1997) was a Swedish water polo player. He was part of the Swedish team that finished fifth at the 1948 Summer Olympics. His father Harald and younger brother Åke were also Olympic water polo players.

References

1918 births
1997 deaths
Swedish male water polo players
Olympic water polo players of Sweden
Water polo players at the 1948 Summer Olympics
Stockholms KK water polo players
Sportspeople from Stockholm